Melvin Zais (May 8, 1916 – May 7, 1981) was a United States Army general who served in the Second World War and Vietnam War.

Military career
A 1933 graduate of B.M.C. Durfee High School, Zais attended the University of New Hampshire and graduated with a Bachelor of Arts in Political Science.  During his freshman year, he studied at the Louisiana State University as a journalism major before transferring to UNH. In 1937 he was commissioned a second lieutenant in the United States Army Reserve. In 1940 he was a member of the original Parachute battalion later the 501st Parachute Infantry Regiment. During World War II, Zais was the commander of the 3rd Battalion and, later, executive officer of the 517th Parachute Infantry Regiment, fighting in Italy, in southern France, and in the Battle of the Bulge.

Zais attended the United States Army Command and General Staff College, and was also a graduate of the Armed Forces Staff College, and the National War College. He was promoted to brigadier general on June 1, 1964; major general on May 1, 1967; and lieutenant general on August 1, 1969. He was named Commanding General, Allied Land Forces South-Eastern Europe, Izmir, Turkey, effective August 1973 following his promotion to general on July 13 the month prior.

Zais' assignments included Assistant Division Commander, 1st Infantry Division, United States Army, Vietnam, 1966; Director of Individual Training, Office, Deputy Chief of Staff for Personnel, United States Army, Washington, D.C., 1966–68. In that role he was instrumental in originating the concept that resulted in the creation of the noncommissioned Officer candidate program. During this time he led the army liaison team responsible for the involvement of Federal troops in suppressing the  April 1968 Baltimore riot; Commanding General, 101st Airborne Division (then designated as Airmobile), Vietnam, 1968–69. He led the 101st Airborne Division in the Battle of Hamburger Hill against the People's Army of Vietnam. He then became the Commanding General, XXIV Corps, Vietnam, 1969–70.

After returning from Vietnam, Zais served Director for Operations, J-3, Organization of the Joint Chiefs of Staff, Washington, D.C., 1970–72 and as Commanding General, Third United States Army from 1972 to 1973.

On August 1, 1973 Zais was promoted to the rank of four-star general and appointed as Commander, Allied Land Forces South-Eastern Europe. He held the position until his retirement on May 31, 1976. Zais died on May 5, 1981 in Beaufort, South Carolina.

Awards and decorations

References

External links
Third Army Website – Commander Biographies
University of New Hampshire Army ROTC website – Distinguished Alumni

United States Army generals
1916 births
1981 deaths
Recipients of the Distinguished Service Medal (US Army)
Recipients of the Silver Star
Recipients of the Legion of Merit
Recipients of the Distinguished Flying Cross (United States)
United States Army personnel of World War II
United States Army personnel of the Vietnam War
People from Fall River, Massachusetts
United States Army Command and General Staff College alumni
B.M.C. Durfee High School alumni
University of New Hampshire alumni
Louisiana State University alumni
Military personnel from Massachusetts